Igor Alekseyevich Gorbunov (12 July 1941 – 22 September 2022) was a Russian politician. He served as Chairman of the Bashkir Regional Committee of the Communist Party of the Soviet Union from 1990 to 1991.

Gorbunov died on 22 September 2022, at the age of 81.

References

1941 births
2022 deaths
Soviet politicians
Communist Party of the Soviet Union members
People from Orenburg